Wieteke Harmanna Cramer (born 13 June 1981) is a speed skater from the Netherlands who won bronze allround medals at the 2001 European Championships and the 2004 World Championships. She also won two national titles, in the 1500 m (2000) and allround (2006). She finished in second place allround in 2002, and in third place in the 3000 m (2000), 5000 m (2001) and allround (2004).

She stopped training in 2009 due to pregnancy. After giving birth to a son (Jip) on 4 January 2010 she changed to marathon speed skating.

Personal records

References

1981 births
Dutch female speed skaters
Sportspeople from Friesland
People from De Fryske Marren
Living people
World Allround Speed Skating Championships medalists
21st-century Dutch women